Luke Francis is a Welsh rally driver in the BTRDA Forest Rally from Rhuddlan, Denbighshire. He is the third generation of a racing family, following his father and grandfather.

Career
In 2012 and 2016 he was the BTRDA champion.

In 2016, he won the first rally of the new season, the Cambrian Rally, moved from its usual October slot to February. In the 2015 season he had the second most stage wins of any other competitor.

Francis drives a Mitsubishi Lancer Evo IX. He also drove in the 2013 Wales Rally GB, his first time in the World Rally Championship but failed to finish.

Francis is co-driven by John H. Roberts.

References

Living people
Welsh rally drivers
1989 births